Nicholaus "Nico" Iamaleava (born September 2, 2004) is an American football quarterback for the Tennessee Volunteers. He was one of the top players in the 2023 class.

Early life and high school career 
Iamaleava was born in Long Beach, California and is of Samoan decent. Iamaleava attended Warren High School in Downey, California. As a senior, Iamaleava threw for 1,726 yards and 25 touchdowns, while also rushing for six touchdowns. He was named the Polynesian Football Player of the Year. Iamaleava was also named the MVP of the Polynesian Bowl, throwing for 186 yards and a touchdown. Iamaleava was rated as one of the top players in the class of 2023, and committed to play college football at the University of Tennessee. 

|}

College career 
Iamaleava enrolled early at Tennessee in December 2022, participating in workouts for the 2022 Orange Bowl.

References 

Living people
2004 births
American football quarterbacks
Players of American football from Long Beach, California
Tennessee Volunteers football players
American sportspeople of Samoan descent
Year of birth missing (living people)